Zähringia (minor planet designation: 421 Zähringia), provisional designation , is a stony asteroid from the intermediate asteroid belt, approximately 14 kilometers in diameter. It was discovered on 7 September 1896, by astronomer Max Wolf at Heidelberg Observatory in Germany. The asteroid was named for the House of Zähringen, a medieval noble family that ruled parts of Swabia and Switzerland.

The first occultation of a star by 421 Zähringia was observed in 2021.

References

External links 
 Lightcurve plot of 421 Zahringia, Palmer Divide Observatory, B. D. Warner (2001)
 Asteroid Lightcurve Database (LCDB), query form (info )
 Dictionary of Minor Planet Names, Google books
 Asteroids and comets rotation curves, CdR – Observatoire de Genève, Raoul Behrend
 Discovery Circumstances: Numbered Minor Planets (1)-(5000) – Minor Planet Center
 
 

000421
Discoveries by Max Wolf
Named minor planets
000421
18960907